Louis Mackey may refer to:

Louis Mackey (American football) (born 1977), American football linebacker
Louis Mackey (philosopher) (1926–2004), American philosopher